Vasilios Pavlidis may refer to:

Vasilios Pavlidis (wrestler) (1897-unknown), Greek wrestler
Vasilios Pavlidis (footballer) (born 2002), Greek footballer